David Joel Horowitz (born January 10, 1939) is an American conservative writer. He is a founder and president of the right-wing David Horowitz Freedom Center (DHFC); editor of the Center's website FrontPage Magazine; and director of Discover the Networks, a website that tracks individuals and groups on the political left. Horowitz also founded the organization Students for Academic Freedom.

Horowitz wrote several books with author Peter Collier, including four on prominent 20th-century American families. He and Collier have collaborated on books about cultural criticism. Horowitz worked as a columnist for Salon.

From 1956 to 1975, Horowitz was an outspoken adherent of the New Left. He later rejected progressive ideas and became a defender of neoconservatism. Horowitz recounted his ideological journey in a series of retrospective books, culminating with his 1996 memoir Radical Son: A Generational Odyssey.

Family
Born in the Forest Hills neighborhood of Queens, New York City, Horowitz is the son of Jewish high school teachers Phil and Blanche Horowitz. His father taught English and his mother taught stenography. His mother's family emigrated from Imperial Russia in the mid-19th century, and his father's family left Russia in 1905 during a time of anti-Jewish pogroms. Horowitz's paternal grandfather lived in Mozir, a city in modern Belarus, prior to leaving for the U.S. In 1940, the family moved to the Long Island City section of Queens.

During years of labor organizing and the Great Depression, Phil and Blanche Horowitz were long-standing members of the American Communist Party and strong supporters of Joseph Stalin. They left the party after Khrushchev published his report in 1956 about the crimes Stalin committed and terrorism against the Soviet population.

Horowitz received a BA from Columbia University in 1959, majoring in English, and a master's degree in English literature at University of California, Berkeley.

Career

New Left 
After completing his graduate degree, Horowitz lived in London during the mid 1960s and worked for the Bertrand Russell Peace Foundation. He identified as a Marxist intellectual.

In 1966, Ralph Schoenman persuaded Bertrand Russell to convene his war crimes tribunal to judge United States involvement in the Vietnam War. Horowitz would write three decades later that he had political reservations about the tribunal and did not take part. He described the tribunal's judges as formidable, world-famous and radical. They included Isaac Deutscher, Jean-Paul Sartre, Stokely Carmichael, Simone de Beauvoir, Vladimir Dedijer and James Baldwin. In January 1966, Horowitz, along with members of the Trotskyist International Marxist Group, formed the Vietnam Solidarity Campaign. The Vietnam Solidarity Campaign organized a series of protests in London against British support for the Vietnam War.

While in London, Horowitz became a close friend of Deutscher, and wrote a biography of him. Horowitz wrote The Free World Colossus: A Critique of American Foreign Policy in the Cold War. In January 1968, Horowitz returned to the United States, where he became co-editor of the New Left magazine Ramparts, settling in northern California.

During the early 1970s, Horowitz developed a close friendship with Huey P. Newton, founder of the Black Panther Party. Horowitz later portrayed Newton as equal parts gangster, terrorist, intellectual and media celebrity. As part of their work together, Horowitz helped raise money for, and assisted the Panthers with, the running of a school for poor children in Oakland. He recommended that Newton hire Betty Van Patter as bookkeeper; she was then working for Ramparts. In December 1974, Van Patter's body was found floating in San Francisco Harbor; she had been murdered. It is widely believed that the Panthers were responsible for her murder, a belief also held by Horowitz.

In 1976, Horowitz was a "founding sponsor" of James Weinstein's magazine In These Times.

Rightward evolution
Following this period, Horowitz rejected Marx and socialism, but kept quiet about his changing politics for nearly a decade.

In early 1985, Horowitz and Collier, who also became a political conservative, wrote an article for The Washington Post Magazine entitled "Lefties for Reagan", later retitled as "Goodbye to All That". The article explained their change of views and recent decision to vote for a second term for Republican President Ronald Reagan. In 1986, Horowitz published "Why I Am No Longer a Leftist" in The Village Voice.

In 1987, Horowitz co-hosted a "Second Thoughts Conference" in Washington, D.C., described by Sidney Blumenthal in The Washington Post as his "coming out" as a conservative. According to attendee Alexander Cockburn, Horowitz related how his Stalinist parents had not permitted him or his sister to watch the popular Doris Day and Rock Hudson movies of his youth. Instead, they watched propaganda films from the Soviet Union.

In May 1989, Horowitz, Ronald Radosh, and Collier attended a conference in Kraków calling for the end of Communism. After marching with Polish dissidents in an anti-regime protest, Horowitz spoke about his changing thoughts and why he believed that socialism could not create their future. He said his dream was for the people of Poland to be free.

In 1992, Horowitz and Collier founded Heterodoxy, a monthly magazine focused on exposing what it described as excessive political correctness on United States college and university campuses. It was "meant to have the feel of a samizdat publication inside the gulag of the PC [politically correct] university". The tabloid was directed at university students, whom Horowitz viewed as indoctrinated by the entrenched Left. In Radical Son, he wrote that universities were no longer effective in presenting both sides of political arguments. He stated that left-wing professors had created an atmosphere of political "terror" on campuses.

In a 2001 column in Salon he described his opposition to reparations for slavery, calling it racism against blacks, as it defined them only in terms of their descent from slaves. He argued that applying labels like "descendants of slaves" to blacks was damaging and would serve to segregate them from mainstream society. In the same year during Black History Month, Horowitz attempted to purchase advertising space in several American university student publications to express his opposition to reparations. Many student papers refused to sell him ad space; at some schools, papers that carried his ads were stolen or destroyed. Walsh said the furor had given Horowitz an overwhelming amount of free publicity.

In 2005, Horowitz launched Discover the Networks.

Horowitz appeared in Occupy Unmasked, a 2012 documentary portraying the Occupy Wall Street movement as a sinister organization formed to violently destroy the American government.

In 2018, Horowitz attracted many critical comments by attacking the Equal Justice Initiative's new National Memorial for Peace and Justice, calling it "a real racist project" showing "anti-white racism". "Lynchings were bad but they weren't mainly about whites yanking blacks off the streets and stringing them up". "A third of the victims of lynchings were white. How many of them do you think this memorial features ."

Academic Bill of Rights
In the early 21st century, Horowitz concentrated on issues of academic freedom, attempting to protect conservative viewpoints. He, Eli Lehrer and Andrew Jones published a pamphlet, "Political Bias in the Administrations and Faculties of 32 Elite Colleges and Universities" (2004), in which they find the ratio of Democrats to Republicans at 32 schools to be more than 10 to 1.

Horowitz's book, The Professors: The 101 Most Dangerous Academics in America (2006), criticized individual professors for, as he alleges, engaging in indoctrination rather than a disinterested pursuit of knowledge.

Horowitz published an Academic Bill of Rights (ABR), which he proposes to eliminate political bias in university hiring and grading. He says conservatives, and particularly Republican Party members, are systematically excluded from faculties, citing statistical studies on faculty party affiliation.

In 2004 the Georgia General Assembly passed a resolution on a 41–5 vote to adopt a version of the ABR for state educational institutions.

In Pennsylvania, the House of Representatives created a special legislative committee to investigate issues of academic freedom, including whether students who hold unpopular views need more protection.

David Horowitz Freedom Center
In 1998 Horowitz and Peter Collier founded the David Horowitz Freedom Center. Politico states that Horowitz's activities and DHFC are funded in part by Aubrey and Joyce Chernick and The Bradley Foundation. Politico stated that during 2008–2010, "the lion’s share of the $920,000 it [DHFC] provided over the past three years to Jihad Watch came from [Joyce] Chernick". Between July 2000 and February 2006 the freedom center provided a total of $43,000 in funding for 25 trips taken by republican senators and representatives including Mike Pence, Mitch McConnell, Bob Barr, Fred Thompson and others. In 2015, Horowitz made $583,000 from the organization.

Horowitz is the editor of the Center's website FrontPage Magazine. It has been described by scholars and writers as right-wing, far-right, Islamophobic, and anti-Islam.

Political positions 
Horowitz is a former Marxist but is now described as being Conservative. Horowitz has described himself as "a defender of gays and alternative lifestyles, a moderate on abortion, and a civil rights activist".

Horowitz opposes Barack Obama, illegal immigration, gun control, and Islam. He has criticized Palestinians, claiming that their goal is to wipe out Jews from the Middle East. He has endorsed Presidents Ronald Reagan, George W. Bush, and Donald Trump.

Horowitz supported the interventionist foreign policy associated with the Bush Doctrine, but wrote against US intervention in the Kosovo War, arguing that it was unnecessary and harmful to US interests. Horowitz supported the 2003 invasion of Iraq. He has written critically of libertarian anti-war views.

During his time in the New Left Horowitz supported the Civil rights movement. Since the 1980s, he has supported anti-black movements, catalyzed by the death of his friend Betty Van Patter, a death in which he believed the Black Panthers to have been involved.

He supported attempts to overturn the 2020 presidential election.

Controversy and criticism

Academia
Some Horowitz accounts of U.S. colleges and universities as bastions of liberal indoctrination have been disputed. For example, Horowitz alleged that a University of Northern Colorado student received a failing grade on a final exam for refusing to write an essay arguing that George W. Bush is a war criminal. A spokeswoman for the university said that the test question was not as described by Horowitz and that there were nonpolitical reasons for the grade, which was not an F. Horowitz identified the professor as Robert Dunkley, an assistant professor of criminal justice at Northern Colorado. Dunkley said Horowitz made him an example of "liberal bias" in academia and yet, "Dunkley said that he comes from a Republican family, is a registered Republican and considers himself politically independent, taking pride in never having voted a straight party ticket".

In another instance, Horowitz said a Pennsylvania State University biology professor showed his students the film Fahrenheit 9/11 just before the 2004 election in an attempt to influence their votes. Pressed by Inside Higher Ed, Horowitz said that the claim was hearsay from a "legislative staffer" and that he had no proof it happened.

Horowitz's books, particularly The Professors: The 101 Most Dangerous Academics in America, were criticized by scholars such as Todd Gitlin. The group Free Exchange on Campus issued a 50-page report in May 2006 in which they take issue with many of the books' assertions: they identify specific factual errors, unsubstantiated assertions and quotations that appear to be either in error or taken out of context.

After discrepancies in her autobiography were detailed by anthropologist David Stoll, Horowitz criticized the autobiography of activist Rigoberta Menchú, an indigenous woman from Guatemala: "The fictional story of Rigoberta Menchú is a piece of Communist propaganda designed to incite hatred of Europeans and Westerners and the societies they have built, and to build support for Communist and terrorist organizations at war with the democracies of the West."

Allegations of racism
Chip Berlet, writing for the Southern Poverty Law Center (SPLC), identified Horowitz's Center for the Study of Popular Culture as one of 17 "right-wing foundations and think tanks support[ing] efforts to make bigoted and discredited ideas respectable." Berlet accused Horowitz of blaming slavery on "black Africans … abetted by dark-skinned Arabs" and of "attack[ing] minority 'demands for special treatment' as 'only necessary because some blacks can't seem to locate the ladder of opportunity within reach of others".

In 2008, while speaking at University of California, Santa Barbara (UCSB), Horowitz criticized Arab culture, saying that it was rife with antisemitism. He referred to the Palestinian keffiyeh, a traditional Arab head covering that became associated with PLO leader Yasser Arafat, as a symbol of terrorism. In response, UCSB professor Walid Afifi said that Horowitz was "preaching hate" and smearing Arab culture.

Criticism of Islamic organizations
Horowitz has used university student publications and lectures at universities as venues for publishing controversial advertisements or lecturing on issues related to Islamic student and other organizations. In April 2008, DHFC advertised in the Daily Nexus, the University of California Santa Barbara school newspaper, saying that the Muslim Students' Association (MSA) had links with the Muslim Brotherhood, Al Qaeda, and Hamas. The next month, Horowitz, speaking at UCSB, said that MSA supports "a second Holocaust of the Jews". The MSA responded that they were a peaceful organization and not a political group. The MSA's faculty adviser said the group had "been involved in interfaith activities with Jewish student groups, and they've been involved in charity work for national disaster relief." Horowitz ran the ad in The GW Hatchet, the student newspaper of George Washington University in Washington, D.C. Jake Sherman, the Hatchet's editor-in-chief, said claims the MSA was radical were "ludicrous".

Horowitz published a 2007 piece in the Columbia University student newspaper, saying that, according to public opinion polls, "150 million out of 750 million Muslims support a holy war against Christians, Jews, and other Muslims." Speaking at the University of Massachusetts Amherst in February 2010, Horowitz compared Islamists to Nazis, saying: "Islamists are worse than the Nazis, because even the Nazis did not tell the world that they want to exterminate the Jews."

Horowitz created a campaign for what he called "Islamo-Fascism Awareness Week" in parody of multicultural awareness activities. He helped arrange for leading critics of radical Islam to speak at more than a hundred college campuses in October 2007. As a speaker he repeatedly met with intense hostility.

In a 2011 review of anti-Islamic activists in the US, the Southern Poverty Law Center identified Horowitz as one of 10 people in the United States' "Anti-Muslim Inner Circle". He has been described as one of the most important personalities and public funders of the international counter-jihad movement.

Personal life 
Horowitz has been married four times. He married Elissa Krauthamer, in a Yonkers, New York, synagogue on June 14, 1959. They had four children together: Jonathan Daniel, Ben, Sarah Rose (deceased) and Anne. Sarah died in March 2008 at age 44 from Turner syndrome-related heart complications. She had been a teacher, writer and human rights activist. She is the subject of Horowitz's 2009 book, A Cracking of the Heart.

Horowitz's son, Ben, is a technology entrepreneur, investor, and co-founder, along with Marc Andreessen, of the venture capital firm Andreessen Horowitz.

Horowitz's second marriage, to Sam Moorman, ended in divorce. On June 24, 1990, Horowitz married Shay Marlowe in an Orthodox Jewish ceremony. They divorced. Horowitz's fourth and present marriage is to April Mullvain.

Horowitz, in 2015, described himself as an agnostic.

Works

Books 
Student. (Ballantine, 1962)
Shakespeare: An Existential View. (Tavistock, 1965)
The Free World Colossus: A Critique of American Foreign Policy in the Cold War. Hill & Wang (1965)
From Yalta to Vietnam: American Foreign Policy in the Cold War. Penguin (1967)
Containment and Revolution. Beacon Press (1968)
Marx and Modern Economics. Modern Reader Paperbacks (1968)
Corporations and the Cold War. Monthly Review Press (1969)
Empire and Revolution: A Radical Interpretation of Contemporary History. Random House (1969)
Universities and the Ruling Class: How Wealth Puts Knowledge in its Pocket. Bay Area Radical Education Project (1969)
Originally published in Ramparts as "Billion a Dollar Brains" (May 1969) and "Sinews of Empire" (August 1969).
Isaac Deutscher: The Man and His Work. Macdonald and Company (1971)
Radical Sociology: An Introduction. Canfield Press (1971)
Isaac Deutscher: The Man and His Work. (MacDonald & Co., 1971)
Counterculture and Revolution, with Craig Pyes (Random House, 1972)
The Fate of Midas, and other Essays. Ramparts Press (1973)
The Rockefellers: An American Dynasty, with Peter Collier. Summit Books (1976)
The First Frontier: The Indian Wars and America's Origins, 1607–1776. Simon & Schuster (1978)
The Kennedys: An American Drama, with Peter Collier. Encounter Books (1984)
The Fords: An American Epic, with Peter Collier. Encounter Books (1987)
Destructive Generation: Second Thoughts About the 60s, with Peter Collier. Summit Books (1989)
Second Thoughts About Race in America, with Peter Collier (Madison Books, 1991)
Deconstructing the Left: From Vietnam to the Persian Gulf. (Second Thoughts Books, 1991)
The Roosevelts: An American Saga with Peter Collier. Simon & Schuster (1994)
Radical Son: A Generational Odyssey. Simon & Schuster (1996)
The Politics of Bad Faith: The Radical Assault on America's Future. Free Press (1998)
Sex, Lies and Vast Conspiracies. (Second Thoughts Books, 1998)
Hating Whitey and Other Progressive Causes. Spence Publishing Co. (1999)
Uncivil Wars: The Controversy Over Reparations for Slavery. (Encounter Books, 2002)
How to Beat the Democrats and Other Subversive Ideas. (Spence Publishing, 2002)
Left Illusion: An Intellectual Odyssey. (Spence Publishing, 2003)
The Art of Political War and Other Radical Pursuits. (Spence Publishing, 2004)
The Anti-Chomsky Reader with Peter Collier. Encounter Books (2004)
Unholy Alliance: Radical Islam and the American Left. Regnery Publishing (2004)
The Professors: The 101 Most Dangerous Academics in America. Regnery Publishing (2006)
Indoctrination U: The Left’s War Against Academic Freedom. (Encounter, 2007)
Party of Defeat, with Ben Johnson. (Spence Publishing, 2008)
One Party Classroom: How Radical Professors at America's Top Colleges Indoctrinate Students and Undermine Our Democracy. (Crown Forum, 2009)
A Cracking of the Heart. (Regnery Publishing, 2009)
Reforming Our Universities: The Campaign For An Academic Bill Of Rights. (Regnery Publishing, 2010)
A Point in Time : The Search for Redemption in This Life and the Next. (Regnery Publishing, 2011)
Radicals: Portraits of a Destructive Passion. (Regnery Publishing, 2012)
The New Leviathan: How the Left-Wing Money-Machine Shapes American Politics and Threatens America's Future. (2012)
The Black Book of the American Left. Volume 1: My Life and Times. (David Horowitz Freedom Center, 2013)
The Black Book of the American Left. Volume 2: Progressives. (David Horowitz Freedom Center, 2014)
The Black Book of the American Left. Volume 3: The Great Betrayal. (David Horowitz Freedom Center, 2014)
Take No Prisoners: The Battle Plan for Defeating the Left. (Regnery Publishing, 2014)
The Black Book of the American Left. Volume 4: Islamo-Fascism and the War Against the Jews. (David Horowitz Freedom Center, 2015)
The Black Book of the American Left. Volume 5: Culture Wars. (David Horowitz Freedom Center, 2015)
The Black Book of the American Left. Volume 6: Progressive Racism. (David Horowitz Freedom Center, 2016)
The Black Book of the American Left. Volume 7: The Left in Power. (David Horowitz Freedom Center, 2016)
The Black Book of the American Left. Volume 8: The Left in The University. (David Horowitz Freedom Center, 2017)
The Shadow Party: How George Soros, Hillary Clinton, And Sixties Radicals Seized Control of the Democratic Party. Humanix Books (2017)
 Big Agenda: President Trump's Plan to Save America. Humanix Books (2017)
The Black Book of the American Left. Volume 9: Ruling Ideas (David Horowitz Freedom Center, 2018)
Dark Agenda: The War to Destroy Christian America. Humanix Books (2019)
Mortality and Faith: Reflections on a Journey through Time. (Regnery Publishing, 2019)
BLITZ: Trump Will Smash the Left and Win. Humanix Books (2020)
The Enemy Within: How a Totalitarian Movement is Destroying America. Regnery Publishing (2021)
I Can’t Breathe: How a Racial Hoax is Killing America. (Regnery Publishing, 2021)
Final Battle: The Next Election Could Be the Last. (Humanix Books, 2023)

Articles 
 Oglesby, Carl, and David Horowitz. "In Defense of Paranoia: An Exchange Between Carl Oglesby and David Horowitz." Ramparts Magazine (March 1975),pp. 15–20.

References

Works cited

Further reading

 Ashbolt, Anthony (November 1986). "Requiem for the Sixties? David Horowitz and the Politics of Forgetting." Radical America, vol. 19, no. 6, pp. 64–73.
 
 
Our Friend David Horowitz - The Trump Propagandist - The New Republic

External links

 FrontPageMag.com
 Horowitz Freedom Center
 Students for Academic Freedom – promotional website for Horowitz's "Academic Bill of Rights"
 
 Interview with David Horowitz by Stephen McKiernan, Binghamton University Libraries Center for the Study of the 1960s, December 21, 2007

 
1939 births
Living people
20th-century American non-fiction writers
21st-century American non-fiction writers
American anti-communists
American political activists
American political commentators
American political writers
American male non-fiction writers
American social activists
American social commentators
American Zionists
California Republicans
Columbia College (New York) alumni
Counter-jihad activists
Former Marxists
New Left
People from Forest Hills, Queens
Reparations for slavery
University of California, Berkeley alumni
Writers from Queens, New York
Jewish American writers
American critics of Islam
Jewish agnostics
Activists from New York (state)
American people of Russian-Jewish descent
People from Long Island City, Queens
20th-century American male writers
21st-century American male writers